Teddy Gardiner (9 November 1890 – 16 September 1938) was an Australian rules footballer who played with Essendon in the Victorian Football League (VFL).

The son of James Henry Gardiner, Teddy Gardiner first played football with North Melbourne in the VFA prior to World War I.

Notes

External links 

		
Teddy Gardiner's playing statistics from The VFA Project

1890 births
1938 deaths
Australian rules footballers from Victoria (Australia)
North Melbourne Football Club (VFA) players
Essendon Football Club players
People from North Melbourne
Australian people of English descent